Brochet Airport  is located  west of Brochet, Manitoba, Canada.

Airlines and destinations

References

External links
Brochet Airport on COPA's Places to Fly airport directory

Certified airports in Manitoba

Transport in Northern Manitoba